Margaret Ann (Meg) Meyer  (born 9 June 1959) is an American economist whose research interests include microeconomics, organizational economics, and contract theory. She works in England as an Official Fellow in economics in Nuffield College, Oxford.

Education and career
After graduating from the Dalton School, Meyer went to Harvard University, where she earned Phi Beta Kappa and summa cum laude honors as the valedictorian of her class in 1981. She earned a master's degree in economics at the University of Cambridge in 1982, and completed her Ph.D. in 1986 at Stanford University.

Prior to becoming a fellow of Nuffield in 1988, Meyer was a junior research fellow in economics in St John's College, Oxford, from 1985 to 1988.

Recognition
Meyer has been a Member of the Council of the European Economic Association (1994-1997), 
of the (U.K.) She has been a Member of the Organizing Committee of European Summer Symposium in Economic Theory (Gerzensee, Switzerland) since 1993. 
Meyer became a Fellow of the Econometric Society in 1998, and a Fellow of the European Economic Association in 2004. She was elected to the British Academy in 2019, and elected a Fellow of the Society for the Advancement of Economic Theory in 2019.

Personal
Meyer's husband is Oxford economist Paul Klemperer.

References

External links

Living people
American economists
British economists
Harvard University alumni
Alumni of the University of Cambridge
Stanford University alumni
Fellows of Nuffield College, Oxford
Fellows of the Econometric Society
Fellows of the British Academy
Fellows of the European Economic Association
1959 births